William Henson may refer to:

William Henson (Australian politician) (1826–1903), New South Wales politician
William Samuel Henson (1812–1888), English aviator
William Henson (cricketer) (1872–1922), English cricketer
William Henson (wrestler), British Olympic wrestler
William Parker Henson (1905–1999), Australian local government representative